Marc Duez (born 18 April 1957 in Verviers) is a race and rally driver from Belgium.

He won the 24 Hours Nürburgring several times, and also the 24 Hours Spa.

Duez also has competed in the 24 Hours of Le Mans and the Andros Trophy.

For years now Marc Duez has been a representative for the RACB , the Royal Automobil Club of Belgium. He strongly promotes the Driver's Academy and the Belgian Racing Circuits.

Also since 2009 Marc Duez has been racing for Fun Still Exists, also known as FSE. For this team he has been racing the Legend Boucles de Spa 2010 and Ypres Historic Rally 2010, and also the Legend Boucles de Spa 2011.

Career results

24 Hours of Le Mans results

WRC results

FIA R-GT Cup results

References

Living people
1957 births
Belgian racing drivers
Belgian rally drivers
People from Verviers
World Rally Championship drivers
24 Hours of Le Mans drivers
American Le Mans Series drivers
European Le Mans Series drivers
Porsche Supercup drivers
World Sportscar Championship drivers
Blancpain Endurance Series drivers
24 Hours of Spa drivers
24 Hours of Daytona drivers
Sportspeople from Liège Province
Oreca drivers
Team Joest drivers
DAMS drivers
FIA GT Championship drivers
BMW M drivers
Racing Bart Mampaey drivers
Larbre Compétition drivers
Ecurie Ecosse drivers
Schnitzer Motorsport drivers
Nürburgring 24 Hours drivers
Cupra Racing drivers